Spiritual Instinct is the sixth studio album by French post-black metal band Alcest. The album was released on 25 October 2019 through Nuclear Blast and garnered mostly positive reviews from critics. Spiritual Instinct features Alcest live bassist Indria Saray performing on bass in the studio for the second time in the history of the band after Kodama.

Background and release
After the release of Kodama, Alcests 2016 album, they departed from Prophecy Productions and signed with Nuclear Blast on 10 April 2019 in anticipation for the release of their sixth full-length studio album.

Critical reception
Spiritual Instinct was released to a positive critical reception, with Metacritic, a review aggregation website that assigns normalised ratings out of 100, determined a score of 82 based on four critics. Sam Law, writing for British rock magazine Kerrang!, gave a rating of 4/5, noting that while the album was fundamentally sound and well produced, it was inferior to Alcest's earlier work. This concern was echoed by other critics, including Lukas Wojcicki of Canadian music publication Exclaim!, and Jason Roche of heavy metal news site Blabbermouth.net. Nonetheless, most reviewers concluded that the album was enjoyable and a worthy addition to Alcest's discography.

Track listing

Personnel 
Alcest
 Neige – guitar, vocals, keyboards, illustration, art direction
 Winterhalter – drums, percussion

Other personnel
Indria Saray – bass guitar
Kathrine Shepard – vocals on "L'île des morts"
Benoît Roux – recording, production, mixing
Mika Jussila – mastering
William Lacalmontie – photograph
Førtifem – layout, illustration, art direction

Charts

References

Alcest albums
2019 albums
Post-rock albums by French artists
Blackgaze albums